Mike Dawes is an English fingerstyle guitar player known for composing, arranging and performing multiple parts simultaneously on the guitar.

Biography
Dawes experimented with keyboards before picking up his first electric guitar at age twelve. He switched to steel-string acoustic guitar in 2008.

From late 2008 to late 2011, Dawes performed instrumental concerts at venues and festivals throughout the United Kingdom both solo, and with a concert harp player. During this time, he performed alongside musicians including Seth Lakeman, Tommy Emmanuel, and Newton Faulkner. In 2009, he released an independent EP titled Reflections, as well as gaining features on two discs in the AGF (Acoustic Guitar Forum) franchise.

In 2012, Dawes signed with Wisconsin-based CandyRat Records. He released a technically virtuosic arrangement of "Somebody That I Used to Know" by Gotye on 19 June. MSN News and Reddit featured him on the front page of their websites. Gotye (Walter De Backer) himself publicly praised the arrangement: "It's a really beautiful piece of music. It's wonderfully arranged. It's just a fantastic piece of music. I also like the instrumental interpretation because it gives a different perspective on the musical arrangement. It's not about how somebody's voice transmits the story of the relationship."

Dawes' next release was another Candyrat single, this time dual-released with an independent collaborative remix featuring Helsinki-based guitarist Petteri Sariola and Adam 'Nolly' Getgood from the US band Periphery. Ten per cent of the proceeds of all independent releases went to FAB Projects, a Kenyan charity providing food, aid, and building projects in the region. His What Just Happened? world tour visited over 30 countries on five continents, including performances on the Great Wall of China and the Troubadour in Los Angeles, as well as the first fingerstyle guitar concert in Lebanon's history.

2016 saw Dawes become the first acoustic artist signed by DiMarzio, sharing a roster with the likes of John Petrucci, Steve Vai, and Joe Satriani, as he co-designed the Black Angel magnetic soundhole pickup with Larry Dimarzio and Nick Benjamin. He began a monthly video and print column with Guitar World in the US and taught as a special guest mentor on season 2 of Sky TV's Guitar Star.

ERA, his second album, was released independently on Dawes' own QTEN Records imprint (King Records in Japan + C&L Music in South Korea) in September 2017. The lead single, a one-man cover of Metallica's "One", gained around 40 million hits in its first fortnight online through Metal Hammer, Viral Thread, and Dawes' own YouTube channel. The single also gained the attention of the progressive metal community worldwide, a fanbase often present at Dawes' concerts. He was also featured on AMC's Better Call Saul playing percussion and additional guitar on "Cold Feet", a song created in a session with Fink.

The 2018 Moody Blues Cruise saw Dawes share the stage with Cathy Richardson of Jefferson Starship while opening for the Orchestra featuring members of ELO.

In addition to playing as a solo artist, Dawes also plays guitar in the synth-pop group Nik Mystery, together with Spencer Sotelo (Periphery) and Jukka Backlund.

Influences and gear
Dawes is heavily influenced by folk, pop, and rock music as well as other fingerstyle players such as Michael Hedges, Pierre Bensusan, and Eric Roche. In 2017, he performed with Andreas Cuntz and Nick Benjamin guitars. He owns and performs with #100 and #138 Benjamin guitars.
He also uses D'Addario strings, DiMarzio pickups, G7th capos, and the Tonewood Amp device.

Awards
Late 2017 saw Dawes named as the 'Best Acoustic Guitarist in the World Right Now' by MusicRadar and Total Guitars end-of-year poll. This title was awarded again in 2018.

Discography

with Nik Mystery
 When EP (2018)
 Maniac Single (2019)
 By a Thread Single (2019)

Solo

Studio albums
 What Just Happened? (2013)
 Era (2017)

Live albums
 Shows and Distancing: Live in the USA (2020)

EPs
 Reflections (2009)

Singles
 "Somebody That I Used To Know" (Gotye cover) (2012)
 "The Impossible" (2012)
 "The Impossible 2.0" (feat. Petteri Sariola and Adam "Nolly" Getgood) (2014)

Other appearances
 "The Impossible" Acoustic Guitar 2 (2008)
 "Clocks" Acoustic Guitar Forum 3 Compilation (2010)
 "Scotch Pancake" Acoustic Guitar Forum 4 Compilation (2010)
 "Melancholia" Yetzer Hara (Flux Conduct, 2017)
 "Boogie Slam" Acoustic Guitar 5 (2019)

Guest appearances
 Acoustic Uprising September 2017: Dawes interviewed and appears in DVD documenting the culture of Modern Fingerstyle Guitar
 FSNBC (Fink – R'coup'd) April 2017: Dawes performs additional acoustic guitar.
 Yetzerhara (John Browne's Flux Conduct) January 2017: Dawes performs acoustic guitar on the song "Melancholia".
 Live in Clearwater DVD/Blu-ray (Justin Hayward – Eagle Rock Records/PBS) September 2016: Dawes performs electric and acoustic guitars.
 The Story Behind Nights in White Satin DVD/Blu-ray (Justin Hayward – Eagle Rock Records/PBS) February 2015: Dawes performs acoustic guitar.
 Spirits Live in Atlanta DVD/Blu-ray (Justin Hayward – Eagle Rock Records/PBS) August 2014: Dawes performs electric and acoustic guitar as well as clips of original music. "Spirits...Live" entered the US Billboard charts at #2.
 Phantom Shadow (Machinae Supremacy – Spinefarm/UMG) August 2014: Dawes performs acoustic guitar in the track 'Europa'.

Tuition
Dawes has produced numerous tuition aids for guitarists looking to learn his style of playing. These include four iOS tuition apps for Apple devices, regular workshops, guitar TABs,  and magazine columns for Acoustic magazine and Guitar World.

References

External links
 

English rock guitarists
English male guitarists
Living people
1989 births
21st-century British guitarists
21st-century British male musicians